Nick Koudis is an American photographer known for images that have a double meaning that poke fun at social insanity. Almost all of his photographs are created using special effects such as miniature or oversized props, or have been digitally manipulated in Photoshop.

Koudis was born in New York City in 1957, spent a portion of his childhood in Brisbane, Australia, then spent twenty-five years shooting advertising images in New York City.

In 1995 Koudis was a charter photographer at Photodisc, now Getty Images. As such, he was a pioneer of royalty free stock photography. His stock images have since been published widely. He has photographed multiple covers of Time magazine. Since 2000, he has been photographing celebrities in Los Angeles, where he now resides.

His work has received the One Show award, Andy Awards for advertising, PDN/Nikon Awards, and is featured in Adobe Photoshop Studio Techniques by Ben Willmore.

External links
koudis.com
nationalgeographic.com
1000 Koudis photos on Gettyimages.com
November 1999 Time magazine cover

Stock photographers
Photographers from New York (state)
Year of birth missing (living people)
Living people